Ossian (pronounced|ˈosh-ain) is a city in Winneshiek County, Iowa, United States. The population was 802 at the time of the 2020 census.

History
Ossian was platted in 1855. It was named for its founder, John Ossian Porter.

Geography
Ossian is located at  (43.146498, -91.763842).

Demographics

2010 census
As of the census of 2010, there were 845 people, 339 households, and 223 families living in the city. The racial makeup of the city was 98.5% White, 0.2% Asian, 0.7% from other races, and 0.6% from two or more races. Hispanic or Latino of any race were 3.3% of the population.

There were 339 households, of which 28.6% had children under the age of 18 living with them, 54.0% were married couples living together, 7.4% had a female householder with no husband present, 4.4% had a male householder with no wife present, and 34.2% were non-families. 28.6% of all households were made up of individuals, and 12.7% had someone living alone who was 65 years of age or older. The average household size was 2.36 and the average family size was 2.91.

The median age in the city was 42.8 years. 22.7% of residents were under the age of 18; 8.6% were between the ages of 18 and 24; 22% were from 25 to 44; 24.4% were from 45 to 64; and 22.2% were 65 years of age or older. The gender makeup of the city was 48.6% male and 51.4% female.

2000 census
As of the census of 2000, there were 853 people, 330 households, and 220 families living in the city. The racial makeup of the city was 99.65% White, 0.12% African American, 0.12% Native American, and 0.12% from two or more races. Hispanic or Latino of any race were 0.35% of the population.

There were 330 households, out of which 33.6% had children under the age of 18 living with them, 57.9% were married couples living together, 5.5% had a female householder with no husband present, and 33.3% were non-families. 29.7% of all households were made up of individuals, and 17.9% had someone living alone who was 65 years of age or older. The average household size was 2.47 and the average family size was 3.09.

27.8% were under the age of 18, 5.0% from 18 to 24, 26.0% from 25 to 44, 18.6% from 45 to 64, and 22.5% were 65 years of age or older. The median age was 39 years. For every 100 females, there were 93.9 males. For every 100 females age 18 and over, there were 86.1 males.

The median income for a household in the city was $38,214, and the median income for a family was $44,306. Males had a median income of $30,500 versus $20,781 for females. The per capita income for the city was $16,490. About 3.0% of families and 5.8% of the population were below the poverty line, including 4.5% of those under age 18 and 15.7% of those age 65 or over.

Education
The community is within the South Winneshiek Community School District.

Notable people
Raymond Philip Etteldorf, Roman Catholic archbishop
Al Palzer, Heavyweight boxer who was promoted as a so-called "White Hope."

References

External links
 http://www.ossianiowa.com/
 Information about Ossian
 http://www.ossian.lib.ia.us/

Cities in Winneshiek County, Iowa
Cities in Iowa
Populated places established in 1855
1855 establishments in Iowa